Louina, sometimes Ole Louina, is a ghost town located 14 miles west of Roanoke and about one mile east of Wadley in Randolph County, Alabama, United States.

History
Ole Louina was a community during early settlement of Randolph County which was settled after the Battle of Horseshoe Bend in 1814 when the Creek Indians were defeated by General Andrew Jackson.

The town was founded in 1834 and lasted until about 1905, and at one time was largest town in Randolph County with two churches, several stores, and a gristmill.

Demographics

Louina appeared on the 1880 U.S. Census with a population of 148 residents. It was the only time it appeared on census rolls.

Notable person
James Thomas Heflin, a leading proponent of white supremacy who served as a Democratic Congressman and United States Senator

Gallery

External links
Old Louina history

References

Ghost towns in Alabama
Geography of Randolph County, Alabama
Populated places established in 1834
1834 establishments in Alabama
Ghost towns in North America
Towns in Alabama